The electoral district of Buninyong was an electoral district of the Victorian Legislative Assembly in Australia. It was created in the redistribution of electoral boundaries in 2013, and came into effect at the 2014 state election.

It largely covered the area of the abolished district of Ballarat East, covering south and southeast suburbs of Ballarat as well as the rural areas to the south and east of the city. It included the suburbs of Eureka, Canadian, Sebastopol, Mount Clear, Buninyong and Golden Point. It also included the rural towns between Linton, Corindhap, Lethbridge, Ballan and Bungaree.

Buninyong was first contested at the 2014 election, and was won by the incumbent Labor MP for abolished Ballarat East, Geoff Howard.

The seat was abolished by the Electoral Boundaries Commission ahead of the 2022 election and largely replaced by the electoral district of Eureka.

Members

Election results

References

External links
 District profile from the Victorian Electoral Commission

Buninyong, Electoral district of
Ballarat
2022 disestablishments in Australia